The 1901 Grand National was the 63rd renewal of the Grand National horse race that took place at Aintree near Liverpool, England, on 29 March 1901. The race was run in a howling snowstorm and was won by the 9/1 chance, Grudon.

Leading Contenders
Grudon was among the leading contenders on the day but with the weather conditions being what they were, most of the trainers and jockeys knew that the race would be reduced to little more than a lottery. Trainer Bernard Bletsoe hit on the idea to pack Grudon's hooves with butter in the hope that this would prevent snow from clogging in them. It is not recorded if any of the other trainers followed this example but it worked as Grudon, a horse who was not rated that highly by his rider, Arthur Nightingall set off without any difficulty while most of the other competitors struggled. Legend has it that Nightingall became so confident that he hacked around most of the second circuit alongside Algy Anthony on his struggling mount Covert Hack until leaving his rival behind with the words "Well I must be going now so ta ta".

Finishing Order

Non-finishers

Media Coverage and Aftermath
Arthur Nightingall gave credit to his victory to the genius of owner-trainer Bletsoe for having the foresight to prepare the horse with butter as he was convinced the horse would have come to grief without the preparation. Of the race he said, "My orders were to let Grudon run his own race and I found myself laid up with the leading division, never out of the first two or three. Indeed Archie [Algy] Anthony [Covert Hack] and I enjoyed a long and animated conversation for the most part of the journey. It was with a feeling of regret that at last I was obliged to say goodbye to him about a mile from home. "Ta ta old chap. I must push on a trifle faster or the cupboard will be bare when I get there, and  wouldn't disappoint old mother Hubbard for the world." "The only mistake he made came 200 yards from the winning post when he jumped a footpath across the course and gave me a bit of a shock."

References

 1901
Grand National
Grand National
20th century in Lancashire